James Colquitt Cagle (born January 15, 1952) is a former American football defensive tackle. Cagle was born in Jacksonville, Florida, in 1952. He attended Marietta High School in Marietta, Georgia, and played college football at Georgia from 1971 to 1973. He then played professional football in the National Football League (NFL) for the Philadelphia Eagles (NFL), appearing in 14 games during the 1974 season, though his playing time in 1975 was principally on special teams and goal line defense. He returned to the Eagles in 1975. However, he did not appear on the final roster.

He signed with the Tampa Bay Buccaneers in 1975, appearing in pre-season games.

References

1952 births
Living people
Philadelphia Eagles players
Georgia Bulldogs football players
American football defensive tackles
Players of American football from Florida